Fresh Ponds is an unincorporated community located within South Brunswick Township in Middlesex County, New Jersey, United States. It is located in a rural portion of the township at the intersection of Fresh Ponds Road and Davidson Mill Road. Forest land, farms, homes, and a church are located around the settlement.

References

South Brunswick, New Jersey
Unincorporated communities in Middlesex County, New Jersey
Unincorporated communities in New Jersey